Verkhnebelsky is a rural locality (a selo) in Nikolayevsky Selsoviet, Beloretsky District, Bashkortostan, Russia. The population was 322 as of 2010. There are 6 streets.

Geography 
Verkhnebelsky is located 36 km northeast of Beloretsk (the district's administrative centre) by road. Tirlyansky is the nearest rural locality.

References 

Rural localities in Beloretsky District